Saint Roderick (died 13 March 857) was a Mozarab Catholic priest, venerated as one of the Martyrs of Córdoba. Tradition states that he was a Christian priest of Cabra who had two brothers: one was a Muslim, the other irreligious. Once, after his brothers began to fight one another, Roderick attempted to break up the fight. However, they turned on him instead and beat him.

When Roderick awoke, he found that his Muslim brother had reported to the authorities that Roderick had converted to Islam. When Roderick maintained his loyalty to the Catholic religion, he was accused of apostasy from Islam under Sharia law. He was imprisoned and then beheaded along with Salomon (Solomon) at Córdoba.

St. Roderick's Convent and Hospital in Cabra, established in the 16th century, bears his name.

External links
Catholic News Agency: St. Roderick
St. Roderick
Cartage: St. Roderick
 San Rodrigo di Cordova
Tourist Atlas of Andalusia
St. Roderic Hagiography

857 deaths
9th-century Christian martyrs
9th-century executions
Christians executed for refusing to convert to Islam
Christians from al-Andalus
Executed Spanish people
Medieval Spanish saints
Mozarabs
People executed for apostasy from Islam
People executed by Spain by decapitation
Spanish Roman Catholic saints
Year of birth unknown